Perdita calochorti is a species of bee in the family Andrenidae. It is found in North America.

References

Further reading

 
 

Andrenidae
Articles created by Qbugbot
Insects described in 1956